Hiroki Narabayashi (奈良林寛紀, born 14 January 1988) is a former Japanese football player who last played for and captains Fujieda MYFC.

Club statistics
Updated to 23 February 2017.

References

External links
Profile at Fujieda MYFC

1988 births
Living people
Aoyama Gakuin University alumni
Association football people from Okayama Prefecture
Japanese footballers
J3 League players
Japan Football League players
Fujieda MYFC players
Association football defenders